This is a list of all venues which have hosted at least one Bangladesh Premier League match. In all seasons Sher-e-Bangla National Cricket Stadium hosts majority of the matches. Till date Play-offs and finals of all 8 season have been hosted in Dhaka.

Matches were played at Sheikh Abu Naser Stadium in Khulna and MA Aziz Stadium in Chittagong only during the  2nd edition.

Sylhet International Cricket Stadium is also hosting limited number of matches since the  5th season.

List of venues

References

External links
BCB Site

Bangladesh Premier League lists